Pelayo Eribo Cubacuba (born 21 December 1975) is an Equatorial Guinean politician and retired footballer who played as a striker. Nicknamed Papuchi, he represented the Equatorial Guinea national team.

Football career

International career
Eribo played for his national team in the 1999 UNIFAC Cup and the 2002 FIFA World Cup qualification.

International goals

Political career
Later, Eribo entered to the Equatoguinean political and was appointed Private Secretary to the Prime Minister and Head of Government.

Notes

References

External links

1975 births
Living people
Sportspeople from Malabo
Equatoguinean footballers
Association football forwards
Equatorial Guinea international footballers
Democratic Party of Equatorial Guinea politicians
Bubi people